Bulgaria participated in the Eurovision Song Contest 2007 with the song "Water" written and performed by Elitsa Todorova and Stoyan Yankoulov. The Bulgarian broadcaster Bulgarian National Television (BNT) organised the national final Bŭlgarskata pesen v „Evroviziya 2007” in order to select the Bulgarian entry for the 2007 contest in Helsinki, Finland. A total of 21 entries were selected to participate in the national final which consisted of two shows: a semi-final and a final, held on 3 February 2007 and 24 February 2007, respectively. Eighteen entries competed in the semi-final and the top nine songs as determined by a twelve-member jury panel qualified to the final alongside three pre-qualified songs. In the final, public televoting exclusively selected "Voda" performed by Elitsa Todorova and Stoyan Yankoulov as the winning entry with 31,376 votes. The song was later retitled for the Eurovision Song Contest as "Water".

Bulgaria competed in the semi-final of the Eurovision Song Contest which took place on 10 May 2007. Performing as the opening entry for the show in position 1, "Water" was announced among the top 10 entries of the semi-final and therefore qualified to compete in the final on 12 May. This marked the first qualification to the final for Bulgaria since they debuted in the contest in 2005. It was later revealed that Bulgaria placed sixth out of the 28 participating countries in the semi-final with 146 points. In the final, Bulgaria performed in position 21 and placed fifth out of the 24 participating countries, scoring 157 points.

Background 

To this point, the nation had yet to qualify to the final. In 2006, Mariana Popova and her song "Let Me Cry" failed to qualify to the final, making it the second consecutive qualification failure for the country.

The Bulgarian national broadcaster, Bulgarian National Television (BNT), broadcasts the event within Bulgaria and organises the selection process for the nation's entry. BNT confirmed Bulgaria's participation in the 2007 Eurovision Song Contest on 24 October 2006. Since 2005, the broadcaster has organised a national final in order to select the Bulgarian entry for the competition, a selection procedure that continued for their 2007 entry.

Before Eurovision

Bŭlgarskata pesen v „Evroviziya 2007” 
Bŭlgarskata pesen v „Evroviziya 2007” (The Bulgarian song in Eurovision 2007) was the national final format developed by BNT which determined the artist and song that would represent Bulgaria at the Eurovision Song Contest 2007. The competition consisted of a semi-final on 3 February 2007 and a final on 24 February 2007, held at the National Palace of Culture in Sofia. Both shows were hosted by Dragomir Simeonov and Iva Doichinova and broadcast on Channel 1.

Competing entries 
On 24 October 2006, BNT opened a submission period for artists and songwriters to submit their entries until 12 January 2007. Songs were required to contain partial Bulgarian involvement. By the end of the deadline, the broadcaster received 32 entries. On 14 January 2007, the eighteen artists and songs selected for the semi-final of the competition by a twelve-member committee were announced. The committee consisted of Vili Kazasyan (conductor and composer), Toncho Rusev (composer), Alexander Petrov (poet), Ana-Maria Tonkova (music journalist), Jivko Petrov (musician), Vasil Stefanov (director), Maga (composer), Slavcho Nikolov (musician and composer), Georgi Kushvaliev (music journalist), Angel Zaberski-son (musician and composer), Misho Shishkov (musician and composer) and Mariana Popova (singer). An additional three entries came from artists internally selected by BNT and automatically qualified for the final of the competition: Elitsa Todorova and Stoyan Yankoulov, Kalki and KariZma.

On 16 January 2007, "Az moga!!!" performed by Pippo and Sasheto was disqualified from the competition due to plagiarism while Una Healy withdrew her song "Too Late for Heartache" due to prior engagements. They were replaced with the songs "Only Way Back Home" performed by Dimitar Atanasov and "V ochakvane" performed by Galin Raichev. On 19 January 2006, "Tova e lyubovta" performed by Orlin Goranov was withdrawn from the competition and replaced with the song "Say You Would" performed by Toni Dimitrova and Goresch Pyasak.

Shows

Semi-final
The semi-final took place on 3 February 2007. Nine entries qualified to the final based on the votes of a jury panel. The twelve-person jury consisted of Vili Kazasyan, Toncho Rusev, Alexander Petrov, Ana-Maria Tonkova, Jivko Petrov, Vasil Stefanov, Maga, Slavcho Nikolov, Georgi Kushvaliev, Angel Zaberski-son, Misho Shishkov and Mariana Popova. In addition to the performances of the competing entries, guest performers were Vakali, Veda Junior and the three pre-qualified artists: Elitsa Todorova and Stoyan Yankoulov, Kalki and KariZma.

Final
The final took place on 24 February 2007. The nine semi-final qualifiers along alongside the three automatic qualifiers competed and "Voda" performed by Elitsa Todorova and Stoyan Yankoulov was selected as the winner exclusively by public televoting. In addition to the performances of the competing entries, guest performers were Vasil Naydenov and Bulgarian Eurovision Song Contest 2006 entrant Mariana Popova.

Promotion 
Elitsa Todorova and Stoyan Yankoulov made several appearances across Europe to specifically promote "Water" as the Bulgarian Eurovision entry. On 15 March, Elitsa and Stoyan performed "Water" during the Greek Eurovision national final Feel the Party. Between 21 and 24 March, Elitsa and Stoyan took part in promotional activities in Croatia and Serbia where they made radio and television appearances, including a performance during the Francophonie Night event which was held at the Sava Centar in Belgrade. On 25 March, the duo performed during the Stars of Europe concert which was held at the Colosseum in Rome, Italy. Elitsa and Stoyan also took part in a month-long cruise trip through Slovakia, Austria and Germany.

At Eurovision

According to Eurovision rules, all nations with the exceptions of the host country, the "Big Four" (France, Germany, Spain and the United Kingdom) and the ten highest placed finishers in the 2006 contest are required to qualify from the semi-final on 10 May 2007 in order to compete for the final on 12 May 2007; the top ten countries from the semi-final progress to the final. On 12 March 2007, a special allocation draw was held which determined the running order for the semi-final and Bulgaria was set to open the show and perform in position 1, before the entry from Israel.

The semi-final and the final were broadcast in Bulgaria on Channel 1 with commentary by Elena Rosberg and Georgi Kushvaliev. The Bulgarian spokesperson, who announced the Bulgarian votes during the final, was Mira Dobreva.

Semi-final 
Elitsa Todorova and Stoyan Yankoulov took part in technical rehearsals on 3 and 5 May, followed by dress rehearsals on 9 and 10 May. The Bulgarian performance featured Elitsa Todorova and Stoyan Yankoulov performing a drum routine. The stage colours transitioned from blue to red during the instrumental part of the song and the LED screens displayed clouds and lightning as well as water imagery. The performance also featured the use of a wind machine.

At the end of the show, Bulgaria was announced as having finished in the top 10 and subsequently qualifying for the grand final. This marked the first qualification to the final for Bulgaria since they debuted in the contest in 2007. It was later revealed that Bulgaria placed sixth in the semi-final, receiving a total of 146 points.

Final 
The draw for the running order for the final was done by the presenters during the announcement of the ten qualifying countries during the semi-final and Bulgaria was drawn to perform in position 21, following the entry from Romania and before the entry from Turkey. Elitsa Todorova and Stoyan Yankoulov once again took part in dress rehearsals on 11 and 12 May before the final and performed a repeat of their semi-final performance during the final on 12 May. Bulgaria placed fifth in the final, scoring 157 points.

Voting 
Below is a breakdown of points awarded to Bulgaria and awarded by Bulgaria in the semi-final and grand final of the contest. The nation awarded its 12 points to Macedonia in the semi-final and to Greece in the final of the contest.

Points awarded to Bulgaria

Points awarded by Bulgaria

References

2007
Countries in the Eurovision Song Contest 2007
Eurovision